Adobo Jazz is a series of "Pinoy Jazz"  CD compilations originally released in early 2002 by Rhany Torres and continued by Richie Quirino (late 2002) and George Almaden (2019).

Series One

Adobo Jazz: A Portrait of the Filipino as a Jazz Artist, Vol. 1

Adobo Jazz Vol. 2

Series Two

Adobo Jazz: Filipino Jazz Music of Our Time, Vol. 1

References

2002 compilation albums
2019 compilation albums
Compilation albums by Filipino artists
Jazz compilation albums
Pinoy jazz albums